Vanburn Alonzo Holder (born 10 October 1945) is a Barbadian former first-class cricketer who played in 40 Test matches and 12 One Day Internationals for the West Indies cricket team between 1969 and 1979. A fast-medium bowler, he bowled alongside the likes of Charlie Griffith and Wes Hall. Holder, who also played for English county cricket side Worcestershire, was appointed an honorary vice president of the club in 2021.

Playing career
He debuted in the tour of England in 1969 and returned again in 1973 as part of an improving side which ended a 6½-year streak of not having won a Test series.

In 1974 he was part of Worcestershire's Championship winning side and earlier in the year he scored his only first-class century, 122 for Barbados.

He took 6 for 39 in 1974–75 against India to help his side win the series. Eventually however he lost his place in the side as younger and faster bowlers were emerging.

Holder played more tests when leading players were playing World Series Cricket in 1977–78 and took 6 for 28 against Australia in Trinidad.

In 1981 he played county cricket for Shropshire in nine matches, scoring 181 runs and taking 45 wickets. At the time he was also playing club cricket for West Bromwich Dartmouth. He also played in South Africa for the Orange Free State.

After retiring he was appointed as a first-class umpire in England in 1992. Holder retired as an umpire in 2010 and as of November 2020 is the most recent non-white umpire appointed by the ECB.

During 2021 Holder was appointed as an honorary vice president of Worcestershire County Cricket Club

Personal life
When his playing days came to an end Holder went on to settle in Worcestershire where he still lives to this day.

References

External links

1945 births
Living people
West Indies Test cricketers
Cricketers at the 1975 Cricket World Cup
Free State cricketers
West Indies One Day International cricketers
Barbados cricketers
Barbadian cricketers
Worcestershire cricketers
Barbadian cricket umpires
Shropshire cricketers
Minor Counties cricketers